Distyliopsis is a genus of flowering plants belonging to the family Hamamelidaceae.

Its native range is Tropical and Subtropical Asia.

Species:

Distyliopsis dunnii 
Distyliopsis lanata 
Distyliopsis laurifolia 
Distyliopsis salicifolia 
Distyliopsis tutcheri 
Distyliopsis yunnanensis

References

Hamamelidaceae
Saxifragales genera